Požarevac City Stadium, also nicknamed Vašarište, is a multi-purpose stadium in Požarevac, Serbia. It is mainly used for football matches and hosts the home matches of FK Mladi Radnik of the Serbian League West. The stadium has a total capacity of 3,500.

History
The stadium was built in 1935 and is part of the Požarevac Sports Centre grounds.

For decades, the stadium had only one stand with a roof that stretched across a few rows in the central area. After Mladi Radnik gained promotion to the Serbian SuperLiga in 2009, the stadium was renovated prior to the 2009–10 season. A new stand was made and seating was installed in both areas, which expanded the capacity to 3,500.

References

Football venues in Serbia
Multi-purpose stadiums in Serbia
Sport in Požarevac